Tale of a Lake is a 2016 Finnish nature documentary film directed by  and Kim Saarniluoto. It is about lakes in Finland, the wildlife in them and their place in Finnish folklore. The film features narration by Samuli Edelmann and Johanna Kurkela.

Synopsis
Tale of a Lake is a nature documentary mixed with Finnish mythology. A central figure is the female water spirit Ahitar, daughter of the gods Ahti and Vellamo. The film passes through the seasons of a year and portrays Finnish lakes and their wildlife, discussing how the terrain and animals feature in folklore.

Production

Filming took place at various lakes in Finland between 2012 and 2016, with around 600 shooting days.

Reception
Nordisk Film released Tale of a Forest in Finnish cinemas on 15 January 2016. It sold 191,000 tickets, which was the highest number ever for a documentary film in Finland.

Panu Aaltio received the 2016 IFMCA Award for Best Original Score for a Documentary and the 2017 Jussi Award for Best Original Score.

Trilogy
Tale of a Lake is a standalone sequel to the 2012 film Tale of a Forest which is about forests and Finnish mythology. A third film in the series, Tale of the Sleeping Giants (2021), was filmed in the mountains of Sápmi.

References

External links
 Distributor's website 
 Production company's website 
 

2016 documentary films
Finnish documentary films
2010s Finnish-language films
Films based on Finno-Ugric mythology
Documentary films about animals
Documentary films about water and the environment
Films scored by Panu Aaltio